Subah may refer to:

Subah, a country division in Mughal India
Subah, a misnomer for a subahdar or nazim (governor) of a Subah 
Subah (TV series), a 1987 Indian Hindi-language TV series
Subah, a character from The Lingo Show, a children's TV show